Across the Niger is a Nigerian drama movie produced in 2004, directed by Izu Ojukwu and written by Kabat Esosa Egbon.Sequel to Battle Of Love. A bold yet sensitive foray into the moral dilemmas of the Nigerian civil war of 1967–1970. It is a story of Nigeria, a love story of Africa: its past, its present and its future. It starred Chiwetalu Agu, who was nominated for best actor in a supporting role for his part in the film at the 2008 4th annual African Movie Academy Awards.

Synopsis 
Before to the start of the conflict, Major Dubem, a prince from the east, served as a soldier in northern Nigeria.

He also married a northerner named Habiba while he was there.

Dubem fled to the east with his wife because his life was in danger in the north.

Even though she is pregnant for him, his father, the king, and the village elders refused to accept Habiba as one of them.

He must wed the lady that they have chosen for him on their own.

Contrarily, his uncle, a liar and a cheat, sells his people out to their enemies.

Cast 

Across the Niger drama features some Nigerian top actors and actress .

 Kanayo O. Kanayo
 Rekiya Attah 
 Segun Arinze
 Chiwetalu Agu
 Ireti Doyle
 Chinedu Ikedieze
 Pete Edochie
 Ramsey Noah

References

Films directed by Izu Ojukwu
2004 drama films
Nigerian drama films